Qin Guan (1049 – c. 1100) was a Chinese poet of the Song Dynasty. His courtesy name was Shaoyou. Taixu was also his courtesy name. His pseudonym was Huaihai Jushi and Hangou Jushi. He was honored as one of the "Four Scholars of Sumen", along with Huang Tingjian, Zhang Lei and Chao Buzhi. The style of his poetry-writing is subtle, graceful, and restrained; he was famous for love-poem writing. His writing style of ci was classified into the Wanyue School, most works of which are subtle and concise. His talent was greatly appreciated by Su Shi, one of the greatest poets during the Song Dynasty. His most famous verse is, "If the two hearts are united forever, why do the two persons need to stay together—day after day, night after night?" ( or The Weaver Girl and the Cowherd).

References
http://www.chinapoesy.com/SongCi_qinguan.html
https://web.archive.org/web/20110920025121/http://www.yktvu.net/tvuf9/dd0/gexizhuye/zwx/wxxs/tssc/qg.htm

See also 
 The Weaver Girl and the Cowherd

1049 births
1100 deaths
11th-century Chinese poets
Poets from Jiangsu
Song dynasty poets
Writers from Yangzhou